Sin Moo Hapkido (pronounced as Shin Moo Hawpkido) is a martial art that combines "hard" and "soft" techniques. From a purely technical perspective, it is very closely related to its parent art, Traditional Hapkido, though it places more emphasis on meditative, philosophical, and Ki development training.  Hapkido is often translated as “the way of coordinating power,” which  places emphasis on the physical techniques that Hapkido is often known for.  However, the founder of Sin Moo Hapkido, Ji Han-Jae, has landed on a different understanding of the term. Hap means bringing together, gathering, or harmonizing.  “Ki” is the energy or breath in the body that connects the mind and the body, and "Do" is the process or way this happens.  Thus, his definition of Hapkido is, “The way of harmonizing the mind and body through the utilization of ki.”  Sin means "higher mind or higher spirit," and "Moo" means "martial art."

When translated in its entirety, Sin Moo Hapkido therefore means, “The way of using martial arts to harmonize the mind and body to reach a higher more enlightened state of existence.”

History
Sin Moo Hapkido was founded in 1983 in Seoul, South Korea by Dojunim Ji Han-Jae (b. 1936) with the assistance of Merrill Jung and other members of the Northern California Hapkido Association.  The curriculum was based on Ji's earlier Hapkido programs that he developed from his three teachers and own personal study.  Ji, Han Jae was an early student (Dan #14) of Choi Yong-Sool, a student of Yawara & Daito-Ryu Aikijujutsu, and the founder of Hapkiyusool, a forerunner of Hapkido. DoJuNim Ji, Han Jae also a student of the teacher known only as Master / Wise-Man Lee (Lee Do-Sa), who taught "Sam Rang Do", weapons, and more, as well as "Grandma", who he considered to be his spiritual teacher.  Though formed in Seoul, the first official school for Sin Moo Hapkido was not opened until 1984 in Daly City (very near San Francisco), California, where Ji began teaching his new art.

The art
Sin Moo Hapkido incorporates a philosophy of non-violence, self-improvement, adaptability, and physical, emotional and spiritual balance, with the basic Hapkido training. Additionally, Sin Moo Hapkido formalizes a series of techniques, although at advanced levels students are expected to synthesize their own work.  The use of energy flows are also emphasized in Sin Moo Hapkido.

Techniques
Sin Moo Hapkido uses holds, joint locks, throws, re-direction, kicks, punches, blocks, pressure points, weapons, and energy flow techniques.

Holds and Joint Locks
Holds and joint locks are used primarily for control of an aggressor. They are primarily defensive, but at more advanced levels can be interpreted as attacks. At the 4th dan black belt there is also taught 30 special attack techniques using variations and combinations of basic locks.

Throws, Re-Direction and Blocks
Throws and re-direction of an aggressor's energy use an attacker's momentum to continue their own motion using the circular motion principle of Hapkido. These techniques depend on the incoming energy of the attack to determine their outcome; a soft or weak attack will require a small or soft re-direction. A large or powerful attack will result in a re-direction or throw that involves much more energy, translating to a more devastating outcome upon the attacker. The blocks used in Sin Moo Hapkido are usually also re-direction blocks, but some blocks are intended to be used to stop an aggressor's attack and because of this some blocks are hard blocks. Also legs are used for blocking.

Kicks and Punches
Sin Moo Hapkido uses a wide variety of strikes. Sin Moo Hapkido incorporates 25 defensive kicks that are useful in "street style" defensive situations that counter incoming attacks – out of the 25 two are specially only used to block kicks, but some of the other kicks can be used the same way also. Many of the kicks are designed for use in restricted spaces like hallways or crowds. After learning the basic 25 the student then learns 7 spin kicks, followed by many special kicks. Special kicks are harder to master but they need more room to be used, and they include doublekicks, flyingkicks, from the ground done kicks, jumpingkicks and combination kicks. Sin Moo Hapkido has numerous striking techniques.

Pressure Points and Energy Flow
Pressure points are used in Hapkido to control the physical body, and to manipulate the body's Ki to stop, disarm and disable an attacker or heal a patient. Sin Moo Hapkido uses many pressure points out of the body's over 750 pressure points. The pressure points are also referred to as vital points.  Sin Moo Hapkido has a special side called Revival Techniques, which specializes on pressure point fighting and eastern medicine.

Weapons
Sin Moo Hapkido weapon training consists of the use of short stick (tan bong), long stick (jang bong), the sword (kum), cane, handkerchief, long-belt/scarf, thrown weapons (knives, rocks, etc...)  and adapting everyday objects to use as weapons. Weapon training is learned in the black belt stages, but knife defense techniques are learned at Brown Belt.

Ranks
Sin Moo Hapkido's ranking system is somewhat similar to other ranking systems. Gups (급, called also kups) are beginner student stages and dans (단) are advanced student stages.  Though Sin Moo Hapkido has had a number of different revisions as far as rank structure, this is the current organization used by Ji, Han Jae. . Lately, Dojunim Ji, Han Jae himself has associated official titles to Dan ranks, adding 10th Dan. He has asked all his top students (8th and 9th Dans) to help the "10th Dans" in their task of expanding and developing Sin Moo Hapkido.

Belt Ranks:
 White Belt
 Yellow Belt (not present in all schools)
 Orange Belt (not present in all schools)
 Green Belt
 Blue Belt
 Red Belt
 Brown Belt

Black Belts:
 1st Dan: Black Belt
 2nd Dan: Assistant 
 3rd Dan: Assistant Instructor
 4th Dan: Instructor
 5th Dan: Master
 6th Dan: Chief Master (Cheul Do In)
 7th Dan: Head Master (Joong Cheul Do In)
 8th Dan: Senior Master (Sang Cheul Sun Sa)
 9th Dan: Senior Grandmaster (Dae Cheul Sun In)
 9th Dan: Senior Grandmaster (Kenneth P MacKenzie) cite: for more information. 
 10th Dan: Supreme Grandmaster (Joong Kwang Sun Sa)
 Beyond Dan ranks : "Dojunim: Ji, Han Jae (Honorable Founder Of The Way)

Uniform
There are many variations when it comes to uniforms in Sin Moo Hapkido as there was no official uniform for many years.  Although a diamond pattern on the dobok top is a Hapkido designation most European schools used white uniforms with black trim, and most American schools used plain white judo uniforms for the first 15 years or so.

The current official uniform is a grey colored dobok often with ties at the bottoms (for leg weights), though many people chose to leave the legs open.  There is a World Sin Moo Hapkido logo on the left lapel and an oval shaped Sin Moo Hapkido logo on the back.

The official uniform (dobok) for "Masters" rank and above, 6th Dan and higher, is white with gold trim as seen in Bruce Lee's "Game of Death" movie.

Meditation and Ki Breathing
Sin Moo Hapkido has many meditation techniques.  They are a combination of Buddhist, Confucian, and Taoist exercises and primarily focus on Ki development and opening the "mind's eye." Sin Moo Hapkido's first exercise is known as Danjeon Breathing and is similar to Chinese Qigong practices.  Sin Moo Hapkido classes usually start with danjeon breathing and end with meditation.

Nine basic life rules
Sin Moo Hapkido's has 9-Tenets which 
are categorized into three groups. The first three are associated with Confucianism.  The second are related to Buddhism.  The last three are related to Zen and Taoism.  These Tenets will help the Sin Moo Hapkido practitioner to have a better and healthier life.

Physical:
 1st Proper diet
 2nd Healthy sexual behavior
 3rd Beneficial meditation

Mental:
 4th Do not be angry
 5th Do not be sad
 6th Do not be greedy

Spiritual:
 7th Water balance
 8th Air balance
 9th Sunshine balance

Basic techniques to attain Green  Belt
 Danjun Breathing
 Warming up exercises
 25 Basic Kicks
 Basic Escapes
 Push/Pull (No Resistance)
 Basic 8 Hand Techniques
  (A) Wrist Defense
  (B) Attacking
  (C) Straight punch defense
  (D) Combination wrist defense
 Front Cloth Grab Defenses
Concentration meditation

Basic techniques to attain Blue Belt
 Spin Kicks
 Punch Defense
 Cross Hand Wrist Techniques
 Behind and Body Grab Defense

Basic techniques to attain Red Belt
 Kicking Styles
 Kick Defense
 Cross Hand on Top Wrist Techniques
 Choke Defense

Basic techniques to attain Brown Belt
 Kicking Styles
 Knife Defense
 Side by Side Wrist Technqiues
 Sit Down/Lie Down Techniques

Basic techniques to attain Black Belt
 Special Kicking
 Throw Defense
 Basic Yudo Style Throws
 Advanced 8 Wrist Techniques

Sin Moo Hapkido Grandmasters (9th+ Dan)

 Ji Han-Jae; Do Ju, Founder
 Jurg Ziegler; 10th dan 
 Kenneth P MacKenzie; 10th Dan 
 Merrill Jung; 10th Dan
 Inwan Kim; 10th Dan
 Frank Croaro; 10th Dan
 John Beluschak; 10th Dan
 Larry Dorsey; 10th Dan
 John Godwin; 10th Dan
 Ian A. Cyrus; 10th Dan
 Dr. Egil Fosslien; 10th Dan
 Kirk Koskella; 10th Dan
 Herman Mochalin; 10th Dan
 Yung T. Freda; 9th Dan
 Walter Hubmann; 9th Dan
 Perry Zmugg; 9th Dan
 Nicolas Tacchi; 9th Dan
 Rafael Balbastre; 9th Dan
 Stuart Forrest; 9th Dan
 Rony Dassen; 9th Dan
 Lee Ka Myung; 9th Dan
 Scott Yates; 9th Dan
 Stuart Rosenberg; 9th Dan
 Farshad Azad; 9th Dan
 Carl Hettinger; 9th Dan
 Rami Vainionpää; 9th Dan

Sin Moo Hapkido Kwans

Since 2014, Doju Nim Ji Han Jae has been issuing Kwan certifications : his top students have been given the authorization to develop their own Sin Moo Hapkido styles, by mixing traditional Sin Moo Hapkido with their own martial arts background. This way, Sin Moo Hapkido can grow much richer year after year, thanks to all these top ranking Masters teaching their techniques all over the world. Here is a list of the Kwans that currently exist within the Sin Moo Hapkido family :

 Shin Yong Do (Frank Croaro)
 Shin Ki Kwan (Scott Yates)
 Yu Shin HapGi Mu yae Kwan (Ian Cyrus)
 Samil Kwan (Sean Bradley)
 Yu Sool Kwan (John Beluschak)
 Song Moo Kwan (Geoff Booth)
 Yu Hwa Kwan (Walter Hubmann)
 Han Do Kwan (Herman Mochalin)
 Jeong Hak Kwan (Nicolas Tacchi)
 Sun Bi Kwan (In Wan Kim)
 Tang Soo Kwan (John Godwin)
 Anu Kwan (Stuart Rosenberg)
 Bi Ho Kwan (Larry Dorsey)
 SinMoo Jung Shin Kwan (Ramfis Marquez)
SinMoo Sung Hwa Do (Kirk Koskella)

Kwans and regions are independent and they are fully authorized to issue Dan certificates. Although, the caveat is that all kwans and regions work together to preserve the legacy of Sin Moo Hapkido and Sin Moo.

However, many of them continue to work together by attending special events such as World Sin Moo Hapkido Federation's "International Hapkido Summit", hosted by "Joong Kwang Dae Sun Sa" Ken MacKenzie. Many Grandmasters like GM John Godwin (Tang Soo Kwan), GM Inwan Kim (Sun Bi Kwan), GM Larry Dorsey (Bi Ho Kwan) regularly attend this cooperation event.

Plus, many European Sin Moo Grandmasters like GM Walter Hubmann (head of Austrian SinMoo Hapkido), GM Rami Vainionpaa (head of Skandinavian Sin Moo Hapkido), GM Nicolas Tacchi (Jeong Hak Kwan, head of French-speaking Sin Moo Hapkido), GM Rafael Balbastre (head of Hispanic Sin Moo Hapkido) and GM Herman Mochalin (Han Do Kwan) still consider "Joong Kwang Dae Sun Sa" Jürg Ziegler as their Sin Moo teacher and attend his European seminars.

In addition, other Sin Moo Grandmasters such as Frank Croaro (First Generation-Senior Student), Farshad Azad, John Beluschak, Stuart Rosenberg, Sean Bradley, Ian A. Cyrus, and Ramfis Marquez, & Scott Yates continue to preserve the legacy of Sin Moo Hapkido for future generations.

References

TaeKwon-Do Times Magazine, Cover / History Feature with Ji, Han Jae, November 2013

External links 
 East European Hapkido Association
 Moo Hapkido Ukraine
 Korean Martial Arts Center-HQ
 Sin Moo Hapkido Han Wang Sool

Hapkido organizations
South Korean martial arts